Launch Complex 576A, also known as Area 576, is a group of rocket launch pads at Vandenberg Air Force Base. The pads at the complex were used from 1959 until 1971 to launch SM-65 Atlas missiles. The site was also known as Complex ABRES. Pads in Area 576A include 576-A-1,2,3

The first operational launch of an Atlas missile by the Strategic Air Command was conducted from 576-A-2 by the 576th Strategic Missile Squadron on September 9, 1959.

The three launch sites are:

 576A-1  
 576A-2  
 576A-3

576A-1

576A-2

576A-3

References 

Vandenberg Launch Complex 576
Vandenberg Launch Complex 576
1959 establishments in California